James Cargill (21 September 1913 – after 1939) was a Scottish professional footballer who played as a forward, either at outside right or inside left, in the English Football League for Nottingham Forest and Brighton & Hove Albion. He also made one appearance in the Scottish League as a trialist for Arbroath.

Life and career
Cargill was born in Arbroath, Scotland. He played junior football for Arbroath Roselea and Arbroath Woodside, and made an appearance for Arbroath in the 1933–34 Division Two season as a trialist, making a good impression in a 4–2 win against Dundee United. Ahead of the 1934–35 season, he went south and signed professional forms with Nottingham Forest of the English Second Division. He made only 10 league appearances in two years before dropping down a division to join Brighton & Hove Albion, for whom he scored 20 goals from 70 appearances in all competitions. He moved on to Barrow, and made his Third Division North debut on 2 September 1939, playing "a capital game" and scoring in a 2–2 draw with Bradford City. War was declared the following day, league football was abandoned for the duration, and his debut goal was removed from the records.

References

1914 births
Year of death missing
People from Arbroath
Scottish footballers
Association football forwards
Arbroath F.C. players
Nottingham Forest F.C. players
Brighton & Hove Albion F.C. players
Barrow A.F.C. players
Scottish Junior Football Association players
Scottish Football League players
English Football League players
Footballers from Angus, Scotland